Svetlograd is a town and the administrative center of Petrovsky District in Stavropol Krai, Russia, located on the Kalaus River,  northeast of Stavropol, the administrative center of the krai. Population:

History
It was founded in 1750 as the village of Petrovskoye. It was granted town status and renamed Svetlograd in 1965.

Administrative and municipal status
Within the framework of administrative divisions, Svetlograd serves as the administrative center of Petrovsky District. As an administrative division, it is, together with two rural localities, incorporated within Petrovsky District as the Town of Svetlograd. As a municipal division, the Town of Svetlograd is incorporated within Petrovsky Municipal District as Svetlograd Urban Settlement.

International relations

Twin towns — Sister cities
Svetlograd is twinned with:

  Rakitovo, Bulgaria (1981)

References

Notes

Sources

Cities and towns in Stavropol Krai
Populated places established in 1750